Chedean Natasha Nation (born 31 October 1986) is a Jamaican cricketer who has represented the West Indies internationally. She plays domestic cricket for Jamaica and Guyana Amazon Warriors.

Career
A right-arm medium-pace bowler, Nation made her international debut in June 2008, on a tour of Ireland. She played both One Day International (ODI) and Twenty20 International matches on the tour, and the following month also played series against the Netherlands and England. In the first ODI of another series against England in November 2009, Nation took figures of 3/22 from five overs, helping her team to an upset 40-run win.

In October 2016, Nation was recalled to the West Indian squad for the following month's tour of India.

In October 2018, Cricket West Indies (CWI) awarded her a women's contract for the 2018–19 season. Later the same month, she was named in the West Indies' squad for the 2018 ICC Women's World Twenty20 tournament in the West Indies. In January 2020, she was named in West Indies' squad for the 2020 ICC Women's T20 World Cup in Australia. In May 2021, Nation was awarded with a central contract from Cricket West Indies.

On 2 July 2021, she and her fellow teammate Chinelle Henry had collapsed on the field in a space of ten minutes during the second women's T20I match between West Indies and Pakistan at the Coolidge Cricket Ground in Antigua. Both of them were immediately taken to the hospital and they were reportedly in conscious and stable position.

In October 2021, she was named in the West Indies team for the 2021 Women's Cricket World Cup Qualifier tournament in Zimbabwe. In February 2022, she was named in the West Indies team for the 2022 Women's Cricket World Cup in New Zealand.

References

External links 
 
 

1986 births
Living people
Jamaican women cricketers
Jamaican women cricket captains
West Indies women One Day International cricketers
West Indies women Twenty20 International cricketers
West Indian women cricket captains
West Indian women cricketers
Guyana Amazon Warriors (WCPL) cricketers